The Great Mystical Circus is a 2018 Brazilian romantic drama film directed and written by Cacá Diegues, his first film in 12 years. It premiered at the 2018 Cannes Film Festival and was selected as the Brazilian entry for the Best Foreign Language Film at the 91st Academy Awards, but it was not nominated.

It is based on a poem by Jorge de Lima and tells the story of a great love affair between an aristocrat and an acrobat and the saga of the Austrian family who owned the Circus Knieps, and their adventures around the world during the early 20th century.

Plot
The story of five generations of the same circus family, from the grand opening of the Great Mystical Circus in 1910 to the present day. Celavi, the master of ceremonies that never ages, shows the adventures and loves of the Knieps, from heyday to decadence.

Cast
Vincent Cassel as Jean-Paul
Bruna Linzmeyer as Beatriz
Jesuíta Barbosa as Celavi
Mariana Ximenes as Margareth
Juliano Cazarré as Oto
Catherine Mouchet as Imperatriz
Antônio Fagundes as Dr. Frederico

See also
 List of submissions to the 91st Academy Awards for Best Foreign Language Film
 List of Brazilian submissions for the Academy Award for Best Foreign Language Film

References

External links 
 

2018 films
Brazilian drama films
2018 drama films
2010s Portuguese-language films